BBC Wales Today is the BBC's national television news programme for Wales, broadcast on BBC One Wales from the headquarters of BBC Cymru Wales in Central Square, Cardiff. According to the BBC, it is the world's longest-running television news programme.

The programme can be watched in any part of the UK (and Europe) on digital satellite channel 972 on the BBC UK regional TV on satellite service. Selected video packages from the programme are available on the BBC news website.

History
The programme began at 6:10 pm on Monday 17 September 1962. Its predecessor, a short News from Wales bulletin, started in 1957 and was originally presented by Michael Aspel. The new programme, originally presented by Brian Hoey, shared a 25-minute timeslot for regional news with Points West from Bristol – at the time, both programmes were broadcast to Wales and the West of England from the Wenvoe transmitter near Cardiff.

By February 1964, two new television regions, BBC Wales and BBC West, had been created with the addition of a new channel (13) for Wales on Wenvoe. BBC Wales Today thus became a 25-minute programme broadcast only to Wales while Points West was only broadcast to the West of England. In 1969, the opening of separate UHF transmitters at Wenvoe (Wales) and Mendip (West) led to complete separation, except for overlap areas in South Wales.

Between September 1984 and September 1988, the programme aired at 5:35 pm – one hour earlier than most of its counterpart BBC news programmes elsewhere in the UK – before moving to the 6:30 pm timeslot in September 1988. BBC Wales Today shared the same studio facilities (studio C2 at Broadcasting House in Cardiff) as S4C's Newyddion programme.

On 28 September 2020, BBC Wales Today joined BBC Cymru Wales' presentation and radio teams at new headquarters in Central Square, in Cardiff's city centre. The first bulletin from the building was coverage of the Welsh Government daily COVID-19 pandemic briefing.

On air
On weekdays, BBC Wales Today broadcasts six three-minute bulletins at 27 and 57 minutes past each hour during BBC Breakfast. A 15-minute lunchtime programme airs at 1:30 pm with a short preview at 5:15 pm. The main half-hour edition of the programme airs between 6:30 pm and 7:00 pm. The late night bulletin airs at 10:35 pm following the BBC News at Ten.

Three bulletins air during the weekend: early evening bulletins on Saturday & Sunday and a late night bulletin on Sundays, following the BBC News at Ten.

From November 2001, a fifteen-minute news bulletin was broadcast on the digital opt-out service BBC 2W, first as 2W News and Sport and later, Wales Today on 2W. The bulletin was axed in 2007.

In 2020 a separate 30-minute broadcast was added to the schedule during the 2019 Coronavirus outbreak, reporting on live Welsh Government press conferences.

Notable on-air team

Weather presenters
 Derek Brockway
 Sue Charles
 Behnaz Akhgar

Former presenters

References

External links

1962 British television series debuts
1960s Welsh television series
1970s Welsh television series
1980s Welsh television series
1990s Welsh television series
2000s Welsh television series
2010s Welsh television series
2020s Welsh television series
BBC Cymru Wales television shows
BBC Regional News shows
English-language television shows
Television shows set in Cardiff
Welsh television news shows
Welsh television shows